HAT-P-8 is a magnitude 10 star located 700 light-years away in Pegasus. It is a F-type star about 28% more massive than the Sun. Two red dwarf companions have been detected around HAT-P-8.

Planetary system
In 2008 the HATNet Project announced the discovery of extrasolar planet HAT-P-8b around this star. This planet is a hot Jupiter gas giant planet.

See also
 HATNet Project
 List of extrasolar planets

References

External links
 http://exoplanet.eu Star : HAT-P-8b

Pegasus (constellation)
Planetary transit variables
Planetary systems with one confirmed planet
F-type stars
Triple star systems
J22520985+3526495